David G. Neeleman (born October 16, 1959) is a Brazilian-American businessman and entrepreneur. He has founded five commercial airlines: Morris Air, WestJet, JetBlue Airways, Azul Brazilian Airlines, and Breeze Airways. Along with Humberto Pedrosa and Aigle Azur, he owned 45% of another commercial airline in Europe, TAP Air Portugal. In 2017 he became a citizen of Cyprus.

Biography
Neeleman was born in São Paulo, Brazil and raised in Utah, U.S. of partial Dutch descent. He lived in Brazil until he was five.

Career
He co-founded (with June Morris) Morris Air, a low-fare charter airline, and from 1984 to 1988, he was the executive vice president of the company. 

In 1988, Neeleman assumed the helm of Morris Air as its president. In 1993, when Morris Air was acquired by Southwest Airlines for $130 million (Neeleman received $25 million from the sale), he worked for five months on their Executive Planning Committee.

After leaving Southwest, Neeleman became the CEO of Open Skies, a touch screen airline reservation and check-in systems company, later acquired by  HP in 1999. At the same time, he helped with another upstart airline, WestJet. JetBlue was incorporated in Delaware in August 1998 and officially founded in February 1999, under the name "NewAir" by Neeleman.

As the CEO of JetBlue Airways, his 2002 salary was $200,000 with a bonus of $90,000. Neeleman donated his entire salary to the JetBlue Crewmember Crisis Fund, which was established for JetBlue employees who had fallen on hard times.

On May 10, 2007, Neeleman was replaced by David Barger as CEO of JetBlue and, on May 21, 2008, he was replaced as chairman of the board by Joel Peterson.

On March 27, 2008, Neeleman officially announced plans to launch a new airline, Azul (Portuguese for "blue"), a domestic carrier in Brazil. Azul completed 2013 with over 5 Billion (BRL) in sales and is currently Brazil's largest airline.

On October 30, 2013, Neeleman and his youngest brother, Mark James Neeleman, a co-founder of Azul, announced the launch of a new company, Vigzul, a home security and monitoring company. Vigzul came from an idea of Mark Neeleman and was founded by David Allred, Brett Chambers and Neeleman serves as chairman of the board and principal investor.

In June 2015, the Portuguese Government decided to sell the TAP Air Portugal Group, owner of the national air carrier, TAP Air Portugal, to the Gateway consortium with David Neeleman in partnership with Humberto Pedrosa who take control of 61% of the capital of the Portuguese carrier. TAP Air Portugal will maintain the country as the airline's main hub for a minimum of 30 years. In July 2020 the Portuguese state increased its stake to 72,5 %. It acquired this stake from Atlantic Gateway Consortium, which now holds 22.5%.

New US startup
In June 2018, he announced plans for a new US airline called Breeze Airways for which he raised $100m capital.

On July 17, 2018, Breeze Airways signed a Memorandum of Understanding with Airbus for 60 A220-300 aircraft to be delivered beginning in 2021.

In 2020, it was revealed that Dr John Ioannidis had not disclosed that Neeleman had funded his estimation of the prevalence of  SARS-CoV-2 in Santa Clara County, California.
Ioannidis' results were much lower than official data, thus creating a conflict of interest.

Personal life
Neeleman, a member of the Church of Jesus Christ of Latter-day Saints, served a two-year mission in Brazil when he was 19.
He has been diagnosed with ADHD. He is the father of 10 children with his former wife, Vicki Vranes. The couple has since divorced. 

His brother Stephen was one of the founders of the American health care company HealthEquity, while his nephew is New York Jets quarterback Zach Wilson.

Neeleman was the 2005 recipient of the Tony Jannus Award for his contributions in the commercial aviation industry. He speaks fluent Portuguese and holds citizenships of Brazil, U.S. and Cyprus.

References

External links

Speaking at Stanford
Forbes Person
David Neeleman Interview
Q&A with Inc. Magazine
There's Something New in the Air
Owner of Azul Launches Home Security Company
Founders of Azul Create Monitoring Company

1959 births
Living people
Brazilian emigrants to the United States
People from São Paulo
Brazilian people of Dutch descent
Brazilian people of American descent
Brazilian businesspeople
People from New Canaan, Connecticut
American people of Dutch descent
American airline chief executives
Latter Day Saints from Utah
Businesspeople in aviation
American Mormon missionaries in Brazil
Azul Brazilian Airlines
WestJet people
JetBlue
20th-century Mormon missionaries
David Eccles School of Business alumni
Latter Day Saints from Connecticut
People with acquired Cypriot citizenship
American people of Brazilian descent